"Faze Alone" is the debut single from  debut album of Faze in Nigeria.  The song is the eighth track on the CD while the remix  is the thirteenth track. They were both performed and written by Faze.

Reception and acclaim
In 2006, Faze Alone won Best Vocal of the Year (male) at the Hip-Hop World Awards.

Music video
The video features a number of people watching Faze while he performs a gig in their presence. Ruggedman was on cameo on the video. While the Remix of the single features only Faze playing instruments and performing the song all alone with no assistance.

References

2004 singles
Faze (musician) songs
Songs written by Faze (musician)
2004 songs